Joshua Benjamin Thomas Arksey (born 20 December 1994) is an English former first-class cricketer.

Arksey was born at Cambridge in December 1994. He was educated at Bottisham School, before going up to Anglia Ruskin University. While studying at Anglia Ruskin, Arksey made two appearances in first-class cricket for Cambridge MCCU against Northamptonshire in 2015, and Nottinghamshire in 2016. A slow left-arm orthodox bowler, Arksey took 7 wickets at an average of 29.28 in these two matches, with best figures of 3 for 41. In addition to playing first-class cricket, he also played minor counties cricket for Cambridgeshire from 2014–18, making fourteen appearances in the Minor Counties Championship, seven appearances in the MCCA Knockout Trophy, and two appearances in the Minor Counties T20.

References

External links

1994 births
Living people
Alumni of Anglia Ruskin University
Cambridgeshire cricketers
Cambridge MCCU cricketers
Cricketers from Cambridgeshire
English cricketers
Sportspeople from Cambridge